Taylorstown Historic District is a historic district in Taylorstown, Pennsylvania.

It is designated as a historic district by the Washington County History & Landmarks Foundation.

References

External links
[ National Register nomination form]

Houses on the National Register of Historic Places in Pennsylvania
Federal architecture in Pennsylvania
Historic districts in Washington County, Pennsylvania
Houses in Washington County, Pennsylvania
Historic districts on the National Register of Historic Places in Pennsylvania
National Register of Historic Places in Washington County, Pennsylvania